The red whip snake or collared dwarf racer (Platyceps collaris) is a species of snake in the family Colubridae. Native to the Middle East, its natural habitats are Mediterranean-type shrubby vegetation, rocky areas, arable land, pastureland, plantations, and rural gardens.

Description
It closely resembles Dahl's whip snake but differs in having a smaller, flatter head. The upper surface is reddish-brown or reddish grey, with a dark band with pale margins on the neck and scattered, smaller dark bands with pale rims on the fore-parts, these markings being more widely spaced than those of Dahl's whip snake. Another distinguishing feature is the fact that the scales on the belly of that species have a keel on each side whereas the belly scales on the red whip snake do not. The eye is surrounded by a ring of pale skin and the area of skin in front of and behind this is dark. The underparts are whitish-yellow.

Distribution and habitat
The red whip snake is native to Bulgaria, Israel, Jordan, Lebanon, Palestinian Territory, Syria, and Turkey. It is typically found on dry rocky areas such as coastal plains with low scrub, bushes and other vegetation.

Behaviour
The red whip snake is a diurnal species. It can move very rapidly, running at prey and grabbing it with its jaws. It feeds mostly on lizards, with large insects supplementing the diet.

Status
The International Union for Conservation of Nature has listed the red whip snake as being of least conservation concern. This is on the basis that the population trend is steady, the snake has a large total population spread out over a wide range, it is common in many areas and tolerates some degree of habitat modification. It does not seem to face any particular threats although in some areas it is persecuted by humans.

References

Platyceps
Reptiles described in 1878
Reptiles of Europe
Reptiles of Turkey
Reptiles of the Middle East
Taxonomy articles created by Polbot
Snakes of Jordan